Mariely Santos da Silva and Mirella Santos da Silva  (born August 15, 1999), known as Lacração Twins (As Gêmeas Lacração in Portuguese), are singers, songwriters, dancers and influencers identical twins. They work with the Brazilian singer MC Loma.

Discography

Singles

References

1999 births
Living people
21st-century Brazilian singers